Oscar Eklund (born August 27, 1988) is a Swedish professional ice hockey player. He is currently playing with Södertälje SK of the HockeyAllsvenskan (Allsv).

Eklund had previously played with the Oulun Kärpät in the SM-Liiga. He also has presented HIFK in Finnish Liiga.

References

External links

1988 births
Almtuna IS players
Brynäs IF players
Djurgårdens IF Hockey players
HC Dynamo Pardubice players
HIFK (ice hockey) players
Huddinge IK players
Iserlohn Roosters players
JYP Jyväskylä players
KooKoo players
Living people
Oulun Kärpät players
Swedish ice hockey defencemen
Swedish expatriate ice hockey players in Germany
Swedish expatriate ice hockey players in Finland
Swedish expatriate sportspeople in the Czech Republic
Expatriate ice hockey players in the Czech Republic